Derna waterfalls is a fresh water waterfall in the Jebel Akhdar Mountains, south of the city of Derna, in the northern Cyrenaica region of eastern Libya. 

The falls have a drop of about 20 metres (70 feet).

   

Waterfalls of Libya
Jebel Akhdar (Libya)
Derna District
Cyrenaica